The Pursuit of Happiness is a 1934 American historical comedy film directed by Alexander Hall and written by Stephen Morehouse Avery, J.P. McEvoy and Virginia Van Upp. The film stars Francis Lederer, Joan Bennett, Charlie Ruggles, Mary Boland, Walter Kingsford, Minor Watson and Adrian Morris. The film was released on September 28, 1934, by Paramount Pictures.

Synopsis
A Hessian soldier serving with British forces during the American Revolutionary War deserts and tries to settle down in Connecticut with a local woman he has met.

Cast 
Francis Lederer as Max Christmann
Joan Bennett as Prudence Kirkland
Charlie Ruggles as Aaron Kirkland
Mary Boland as Comfort Kirkland
Walter Kingsford as Rev. Lyman Banks
Minor Watson as Col. Sherwood
Adrian Morris as Thad Jennings
Barbara Barondess as Meg Mallory
Duke York as Jonathan
Burr Caruth as Rev. Myles
Jules Cowles as The Drunk
Irving Bacon as Bijah
Spencer Charters as Sam Evans
Holmes Herbert as Gen. Sir Henry Clinton
Henry Mowbray as King George III (uncredited)
Edward Peil Sr. as Peddler (uncredited)

See also
 List of films about the American Revolution
 List of television series and miniseries about the American Revolution

References

External links 
 

1934 films
American historical comedy films
1930s historical comedy films
Paramount Pictures films
Films directed by Alexander Hall
American Revolutionary War films
American black-and-white films
1934 comedy films
1930s English-language films
1930s American films